Michael Drga (born 4 February 1995) is an Austrian footballer who plays for FCM Traiskirchen in the Austrian Regionalliga East.

References

External links
 

1995 births
People from Wiener Neustadt-Land District
Living people
Austrian footballers
Association football forwards
SKN St. Pölten players
SV Mattersburg players
SKU Amstetten players
SK Vorwärts Steyr players
2. Liga (Austria) players
Austrian Regionalliga players
Footballers from Lower Austria